Reliance Health is a subsidiary organisation of Reliance Anil Dhirubhai Ambani Group. The organisation looks after the health-care component of the conglomerate. The organisation is headed by the Indian businessman Anil Ambani. It runs two major hospitals and multiple medical centres throughout India.

Kokilaben Dhirubhai Ambani Hospital, Mumbai
The 150 bed multi-speciality hospital underwent a 'soft' launch in early 2008 for employees and doctors who had accepted offers with KDAH, and became operational in the first week of 2009. The project was initiated in 1999 by Dr. Nitu Mandke as a large-scale heart hospital. It had the first 3-room intra-operative MRI suite (IMRIS) in South Asia.

The hospital is named after Kokilaben Ambani, the wife of Dhirubhai Ambani who founded of the Reliance group of companies.

Reliance Hospital, Navi Mumbai
Reliance Hospital was inaugurated on 8 July 2018 by the then-Maharashtra CM Devendra Fadnavis. This is second hospital opened by Reliance ADAG. It is a 9-storey building with 225 beds offering super-speciality in Oncology, and Pediatrics.

References
Kokilaben Dhirubhai Ambani Hospital and Medical Research Institute. Advertisement in the British Medical Journal, 11 April 2008.

External links
Kokilaben Dhirubhai Ambani Hospital & Medical Research Institute

Reliance Group
Companies based in Mumbai
Indian companies established in 2006
Health care companies established in 2006
2006 establishments in Maharashtra